= Still Human (2022 film) =

- Directed by: David Albert Habif
- Produced by: David Albert Habif
- Release date: 2022
- Running time: 120 minutes

Still Human is a 2022 documentary film by David Albert Habif. The documentary film is a social examination of the two cities of Mumbai and Los Angeles and the struggles and causes of the most deprived populations in these two cities.

== Synopsis ==
The documentary discusses the reason and remedy for the condition of poor and orphans leaving in Mumbai and Los Angeles. These two cities are compared for their similar problems of income and social disparity, where Mumbai's biggest problem is its huge population, Los Angeles has a huge wealth gap with prevalent homelessness. The first half of documentary film covers Mumbai, role of the government and its population. The second is about Los Angeles and the growing crises of homelessness, drug addictions and mental health issues. The documentary also covers the race relations, low-quality education, the foster care system, the rise in violence, and the disproportional prison population.

== Awards ==
| Award | Year | Category | Result | Ref(s) |
|---|---|---|---|---|
| Beyond Earth Film Festival | 2022 | Best Documentary | Won | |
| Medusa Film Festival | 2022 | Best Documentary | Won | |
| Black Swan International Film Festival | 2022 | Critics Choice Awards | Won | |
| Critics Choice International Film Festival | 2022 | Best Documentary | Nominated | |
| Golden Eyes | 2023 | Best Documentary | Nominated | |

== Reception ==
Film Threat found that "Still Human is a political documentary that backs no particular position or party stance. The right and left created the problems it spotlights, and both have a vested interest in keeping us citizens off-balance and at each other’s throats" while another review judged that "This movie is not for people just realizing that people worldwide are suffering. This is the film for the person who has seen all those gutwrenching displays of poverty and wants to find more of a solution."
